União Ciclista de Vila do Conde is an amateur cycling team that is based in Portugal and races predominantly in cyclo-cross. During the 2000s, it tried to assert itself with a road race professional cycling team, achieving European UCI Continental Tour status.

Team roster

Major wins

 2002
  Overall Circuito Montañés, Óscar Serrano
 Points classification, Óscar Serrano
 Stage 4 Rafael Milá
 Stage 5 & 7 Óscar Serrano
 Stage 1 Volta ao Alentejo, Rubén Galván
  Portuguese Under-23 Time Trial Championship, Sérgio Paulinho
 Teams classification Volta a Portugal do Futuro
 Points classification, Sérgio Paulinho
 Mountains classification, Sérgio Paulinho
 Prologue, Stage 2, 3 & 4, Sérgio Paulinho
 2003
 Sprints classification Volta ao Algarve, Óscar Serrano
 Points classification Circuito Montañés, Óscar Serrano
 Stage 5a & 6
 Stage 3 Volta a Portugal, Victoriano Fernández
 2004
 Young rider classification GP M.R. Cortez–Mitsubishi, Sérgio Ribeiro
 Sprints classification Volta ao Alentejo, Óscar Serrano
 2005
 Stage 1 Volta a Portugal, Fidel Chacón

References
2006 team
2007 team

External links 
 

Vitoria-ASC
Cycling teams established in 2002
Cycling teams disestablished in 2007
Defunct cycling teams based in Portugal